Akros–Excelsior–Thömus is a Swiss UCI Continental team founded in 2014. It participates in UCI Continental Circuits races, and held UCI Professional Continental for one year, in 2016.

Team roster

Major wins
2014
Trofeo Edil C, Andrea Vaccher
Overall Giro del Friuli-Venezia Giulia, Simone Antonini
Stage 1a, Team time trial
2015
Trofeo Alcide Degasperi, Alberto Cecchin
Stage 1 Boucles de la Mayenne, Andrea Pasqualon
Stage 2 Oberösterreich Rundfahrt, Andrea Pasqualon
 U23 National Time Trial Championships, Miloš Borisavljevic
Stage 2 Ronde van Midden-Nederland, Alberto Cecchin
2019
Stage 1 Rhône-Alpes Isère Tour, Claudio Imhof
Stage 1 Sibiu Cycling Tour, Justin Paroz

References

External links

UCI Continental Teams (Europe)
Cycling teams based in Switzerland
Cycling teams established in 2014
2014 establishments in Switzerland
Former UCI Professional Continental teams